Kasethan Kadavulada is a 1972 Indian Tamil-language film. It may also refer to:

 Kasethan Kadavulada (2011 film)
 Kasethan Kadavulada (2023 film)